Wangenies is a village of Wallonia and a district of the municipality of Fleurus located in the province of Hainaut, Belgium.

It was a municipality on its own, prior to the fusion of municipalities of 1977.

Former municipalities of Hainaut (province)